Bruce Marks is an American dancer, performing both in ballet and modern dance.  He continues to work as a choreographer, coach and teacher and is a tireless advocate for the art form.

Early years 
Bruce Marks, born in New York City, began his training at age 13 at the New York High School of Performing Arts, and at 14, created the role of the young boy in Pearl Lang’s Ironic Rite. (Later  Rites ) Through his teen years, he performed with Pearl Lang's company, creating roles in Lang's , And Joy Is My Witness, Nightflight, Apasionado, Black Marigolds, and Shira. Marks continued his studies at Brandeis University(1954–1955) and The Juilliard School(1955–1956), where he studied with Margaret Craske, Alfredo Corvino, Mattlyn Gavers, and Antony Tudor—who became his mentor.

The Metropolitan Opera 
At Tudor's suggestion in 1956, Marks joined the Metropolitan Opera Ballet. He was soon singled out for principal roles. After appearing in a ballet evening in 1959 at The Met dancing Adam in choreographer John Butler's In The Beginning, Marks was invited to appear at the Spoleto Festival of Two Worlds as a member of a company organized by Herbert Ross and John Butler.

Metropolitan Opera, Marks danced principal roles in:

 Aida
 Alcestis
 Carmen
 La Giaconda
 The Gypsy Baron
 Lucia de Lammermoor

—AND--

 Rigoletto
 La Forza del Destino
 Les contes d'Hoffmann
 La Traviata
 Eugene Onegin
 Faust
 Die Meistersinger von Nurnberg
 Orfeo ed Euridice
 Samson et Dalila
 Tannhauser

American Ballet Theatre 
In 1961, again at the suggestion of Tudor, Marks joined The American Ballet Theatre. He soon became one of the most respected and versatile of ABT's male contingent, excelling in both modern and classical ballets, and was quickly promoted to principal dancer. He created one of the leading roles in the American premiere of Harald Lander’s Etudes as well as the leading role of Prince Siegfried in ABT's first full-length production of Swan Lake. In 1968 Marks performed the role of Hilarion in the American Ballet Theatre's film of Giselle.

Roles performed by Marks at American Ballet Theatre:

 Theme and Variations
 Grand Pas Glazanov
 Billy the Kid
 Pillar of Fire
 Dark Elegies
 Gala Performance
 Romeo and Juliet
 Etudes
 Miss Julie
 Moon Reindeer
 Sargasso
 Gaité Parisienne
 Aleko
 A Rose for Miss Emily
 Tally Ho
 Concerto
 Swan Lake
 The Sleeping Beauty
 At Midnight
 Balladen Der Liebe
 Helen of Troy
 Coppelia
 Electra
 Jardin Aux Lilas
 The Moor's Pavane
 Petrouchka
 Ricecare
 The Taming of the Shrew
 Tchaikovsky Pas de Deux

The Royal Danish Ballet 
After twice appearing as guest artist with the company, Marks was invited to become the first American principal dancer of the Royal Danish Ballet. He made his debut as such in May, 1971 at the Danish Ballet and Music Festival dancing Paul Taylor's  Aureole.  It was the first time a modern trained artist had done the work in Copenhagen and he received rave reviews.  The next evening he danced the role of James in the 19th century Danish classic, La Sylphide, by August Bournonville and astounded with his versatility.

Marks ended his performing career in 1976 in Denmark taking on his first artistic directorship with Ballet West in Salt Lake City, Utah.

Marks danced principal roles at the Royal Danish Ballet in:

 La Sylphide
 Napoli
 Far From Denmark
 Aureole
 Prism
 Trio
 Rigoletto
 The Triumph of Death
 Romeo and Juliet
 The Nutcracker
 Miss Julie
 Moon Reindeer
 A Touch of the Poet
 The Moor's Pavane et al.
 Winter's Court

As guest artist 

Marks has danced as guest artist with:

London Festival Ballet
Grand Theatre de Geneve
Les Grands Ballets Canadiens de Montreal
The Royal Swedish Ballet
The Royal Danish Ballet
Teatro Municipal Firenze, Maggio Musicale

At Ballet West 
By 1976, Marks became Co-Artistic Director of Ballet West at the invitation of its founder, Willam Christensen. Following Christensen's retirement in 1978, Marks was named Artistic Director. The company flourished under Marks's direction, and his distinctive stamp was made with the addition of new works to the company's repertory from Bournonville and Balanchine to the 19th century master works as well as modern dance classics.

In 1985, Marks and Toni Lander recreated and staged the “lost” 1855 Bournonville ballet, Abdallah for Ballet West, to great acclaim. The production had its East Coast premiere at Washington's Kennedy Center, on May 1, 1985, and the critics raved. "Abdallah is a triumph!” cheered the Boston Globe. The Wall Street Journal declared, “That it communicates such broad meanings and does so, moreover, with such effortless charm, is the great achievement of Bruce Marks.” In 1986, Marks staged Abdallah for the Royal Danish Ballet, the company for whom the work was originally created, and in 1990, he brought the production to Boston Ballet.

At Boston Ballet 
Marks then assumed the position of Artistic Director of Boston Ballet When he was appointed Artistic Director and CEO (combining the jobs was a first in the world of ballet), he eradicated the company's debt which was then 50% of the budget. During his tenure, the company's annual budget and attendance tripled. Under his dynamic leadership, Boston Ballet achieved international acclaim and built a reputation for performing authentic versions of the classics and for encouraging daring modern works. In 1991, in Boston's South End, Marks opened a new facility that continues to be one of the country's leading centers for dance and dance education. His time in Boston had many highlights: an unprecedented American/Soviet production of  Swan Lake; the company's 1990 debut at Washington's Kennedy Center; a 1991 five-city tour of Spain; and in 1993, to inaugurate its 30th season, a highly acclaimed version of The Sleeping Beauty. Following a second Kennedy Center engagement in March 1994, Boston Ballet became the first American company to perform John Cranko’s Onegin. In 1995, Marks added Cranko's The Taming of the Shrew to the company's repertory, followed in 1997 by Michael Corder’s award-winning Cinderella. Marks mounted the world's most popular production of The Nutcracker. Continuing to add to Boston's repertory, he brought the oldest existing version of Coppélia from The Royal Danish Ballet plus a traditional Russian production of Giselle, staged by Anna-Marie Holmes and coached by Natalia Dudinskaya of the Kirov Ballet.

Encouraging young American choreographers was one of Marks's major thrusts as Director. As such, he commissioned works by Danny Buraczeski, Bill T. Jones, Ralph Lemon, Monica Levy, Susan Marshall, Bebe Miller, Daniel Pelzig and Lila York. He also added works by Merce Cunningham and Twyla Tharp.

In July 1998, Marks stepped down from his post at Boston Ballet to become Artistic Director Emeritus.

As chairman of the jury: USA International Ballet Competition 

In 1989, Marks was chosen to succeed the late Robert Joffrey as Chairman of the International Jury of the USA International Ballet Competition held in Jackson Mississippi, a position he held through 2010. He served as the American judge at the international competitions in Helsinki, Nagoya, Moscow, and Seoul as well as at the 1994 Prix de Lausanne in Switzerland and chairman of the 2012 Jury, 4th Beijing International Invitational Competition for Dance Schools.

As arts advocate 
Marks is a founding member of Dance/USA, a national service organization that represents professional dance companies and from 1990 to 1992 was Dance/USA's chairman. 1990–92, he was board chairman of the American Arts Alliance.  He was also Artist Fellow of the Aspen Institute for Humanistic Studies.  He served on the Inter-Arts Panel of the NEA and also chaired the International Performing Arts Touring Committee. He has been a member of and chaired the National Endowment for the Arts Dance Panel, and was a member of the NEA's International Advisory Panel. In 1997, Marks was appointed to the US-USSR Commission on Theatre and Dance Studies of the American Council of Learned Societies, and to the Theatre Union of the USSR for 1988–89, a commission set up to foster Soviet/American cooperation in the fields of dance history, theory, criticism and practice.

As educator
Marks has been a pioneer in innovative dance education and outreach programs including Boston Ballet's precedent-setting Center for Dance Education's City Dance, a tuition-free ballet training program for urban public school students. Marks has taught and coached worldwide including The Beijing Dance Academy, China, International Ballet Seminar, Copenhagen, University of the Arts, Seoul, Korea et al. Marks also has created a landmark training program for Artistic Directors.

As choreographer 
Marks has created over thirty ballets including Clockwise, Dichterliebe, Asylum, Inner Space, Don Juan, Songs of the Valley, Lark Ascending, Sanctus, Abdallah, Pipe Dreams, Don Quixote, Continuo I and Continuo II, Inscape, Shake It Up, Tales of Hans Christian Andersen, Straight from the Heart, The Parting, Fragments, La Fille Mal Gardée (with Samantha Dunster), Greenfields of America, Old Demons, et al.

Marks has coached and staged works for American Ballet Theatre, The Royal Danish Ballet, National Ballet of Canada, NBA Ballet Tokyo, Boston Ballet, Ballet West, Kansas City Ballet, Nevada Ballet Theater, Louisville Ballet, [Charleston Ballet Theater, Fort Worth Ballet, Introdans and others.

As consultant 
In 1998, Marks created ArtsVenture, Inc., a consulting firm dedicated to passing along to others the vast knowledge and insights that he has accumulated in the field. Through ArtsVenture, he has served as a consultant to the British Arts Council, Canada Council for the Arts, as well as dance companies in America such as the Fort Worth Ballet (later known as Texas Ballet Theater), José Limón Dance Company, and Louisville Ballet.

Personal life 
In 1966, Marks married Danish ballerina Toni Lander with whom he had three sons—Erik Antony, Adam Christopher, and Kenneth Rikard. After Lander died in 1985, Marks married painter, theater-designer, and writer, Paul Fiumedoro. The two reside in south Florida where Marks is currently at work on his autobiography.

Honors and awards 
 1991 Sonja Loew Award, for Excellence in the Arts
 1994 National Governors' Association, for Distinguished Service to the Arts
 1995 Capezio Dance Award for Achievement in Dance and Contributions toward Public Awareness of Dance in America
 1997 Dance Magazine Award
 1998 Dance/USA Honors
 2005 May - Juilliard Centennial Medal
 2008 Dance Masters of America Annual Award
 2008 Vasterling Award, for Artistic Vision and Excellence

Honorary degrees: doctor of fine arts 
 Wheaton College
 Franklin Pierce College
 Northeastern University
 University of Massachusetts Amherst
 Juilliard
 The Boston Conservatory

References

External links 
 Bruce Marks Interview Bruce Marks by Bill Ernst
 Ballet West West Pointe - Ballet West
 Utah History Utah History Encyclopedia, Ballet West - by Cherie N Willis
 Charleston CVB Ballet legend Bruce Marks celebrates in CBT's Latest masterpieces of Dance Scottie Theatre
 Ballet Alert The King of Crossover crosses back - A conversation with Bruce Marks by Alexandra Tomalonis
 Curriculum Bruce Marks Encontro Internacional de Dança de Goiás, Jan 2011

1936 births
Living people
Artists from New York City
American male ballet dancers
New York City Ballet principal dancers
New York City Ballet Diamond Project choreographers
Prix Benois de la Danse jurors
Artistic directors